Tulika Books is a New Delhibased independent publisher of scholarly and academic books in the humanities and social sciences, with a "broadly left perspective." The Chennai-based Tulika Publishers is a sister company of Tulika Books.

History 
Tulika Books was founded in 1995. It is managed by the Managing Editor Indira (née Indu) Chandrasekhar, who started her career as a copy editor with Macmillan India in the 1980s and also did some teaching in Bangalore and Delhi Universities. The authors published by Tulika include some of India's best known left intellectuals and academics.

Tulika Books is one of the founder-members of the Independent Publishers' Distribution Alternative of India and the Independent Publishing Group.
In 2014, it won the Printed Book of the Year award from Publishing Next for the book Project Cinema City. The book falls into the Tulika Books' line of "art books," books on modern Indian art as well on modern Indian artists.

In 2013, Chandrasekhar protested the invitation of Narendra Modi as the chief guest of the "Romancing Print" conference. She and several other publishers withdrew from the conference, as a result of which Modi is said to have cancelled his plans to address the conference.
Chandrasekhar is a member of the India Chapter of the Palestinian Campaign for the Academic and Cultural Boycott of Israel.

The former Tulika editor Sudhanva Deshpande went on to work as the managing director of the explicitly leftist publisher LeftWord Books and Tulika maintains links with LeftWord. Its books are provided on the LeftWord Book Club and Chandrasekhar serves on the editorial advisory board of LeftWord.

Publications

Book series 
 A People's History of India (in partnership with Aligarh Historians Society)
 Comprehensive History & Culture of Andhra Pradesh (in association with Andhra Pradesh History Congress & Potti Sreeramulu Telugu University)
 Agrarian Studies
 Labour History
 Modern Indian Thinkers (in association with Social Scientist)
 Muttukadu Papers
 India Since the 90s

Journals 
 Social Scientist  (in association with Indian School of Social Sciences)

Selected authors 

 Akeel Bilgrami
 Jomo Kwame Sundaram
 Ben Fine
 Irfan Habib
 A. G. Noorani
 K. M. Shrimali

 Prabhat Patnaik
 Shereen Ratnagar

 Jayati Ghosh

 Sashi Kumar

 Paritosh Sen
 Arpita Singh

 Gautam Bhatia
 Devi Prasad
 Vivan Sundaram

 Barnita Bagchi
 Amiya Kumar Bagchi

 Shireen Moosvi

See also 

 Kali for Women
 Zubaan Books
 Ritu Menon
 Bhatkal and Sen

References 

Publishing companies established in 1995
Book publishing companies of India
Leftist organisations in India
Publishing companies of India